Region Scania is the regional council of Scania County in Sweden. Scania County was formed on January 1, 1999, by the amalgamation of the county councils of Malmöhus County and Kristianstad County and some of the tasks handled by Malmö Municipality.

The regional council assembly is the highest political body in the region and its members are elected by the population of Scania County, as opposed to the County Administrative Board (länsstyrelsen) which guards the interests of the state in the region under the chairmanship of the county governor.

The regional council's main responsibility is for the public healthcare system, public transport and development within the region, which includes co-ordination of development of commerce, communication, culture and collaboration with other regions both in and outside of Sweden.

By devolution the newly formed regional council assumed some powers from the Scania County Administrative Board, the state authority in Scania County.

Before Region Scania was formed in 1999 on a trial basis, the regional development was the responsibility of a Regional Association, comprising the 33 municipalities together with the then current health services principals, namely the Kristianstad and Malmöhus county councils and the Health Services authority in the City of Malmö.

Similar provisions had also been extended to the Västra Götaland Regional Council and the Gotland Council during a trial period.

Regional council
The regional council (formerly landstingsfullmäktige) meets at Scania Town Hall in Kristianstad. Elections are held every fourth year in conjunction with the national and municipal elections, on the third Sunday of September.

The executive body of the Scania Regional Council is the Regional Executive Committee (regionstyrelsen). The current chair of the executive committee is Carl Johan Sonesson of the Moderate Party, who succeeded Henrik Fritzon of the Social Democratic Party following the 2018 elections.

See also
 Politics of Sweden
 Elections in Sweden

References

External links
 
 Official website in English

County Councils of Sweden
Scania
Organizations established in 1999
1999 establishments in Sweden